Teddy Weatherford (October 11, 1903 − April 25, 1945) was an American jazz pianist and an accomplished stride pianist.

Weatherford was born in Pocahontas, Virginia and was raised in neighboring Bluefield, West Virginia. From 1915 through 1920, he lived in New Orleans, Louisiana, where he learned to play jazz piano. He then moved to Chicago, Illinois, where he worked with such bands as that of Erskine Tate through the 1920s and with such jazz notables as Louis Armstrong and Johnny Dodds and impressed the young Earl Hines.

Weatherford then traveled, first to Amsterdam, then around Asia playing professionally. In the early 1930s, he led a band at the Taj Mahal Hotel in Bombay (now Mumbai), India. He joined Crickett Smith's band in Jakarta, Indonesia. Weatherford took over leadership of Smith's band in Ceylon (now Sri Lanka) in 1937.

During World War II, he led a band in Calcutta, where he made radio broadcasts for the U. S. Armed Forces Radio Service. Performers with Weatherford's band included Bridget Althea Moe, Jimmy Witherspoon, Roy Butler and Gery Scott.

Teddy Weatherford died of cholera in Calcutta, aged 41.

References

Further reading 
Bradley Shope, American Popular Music in Britain's Raj. Rochester, NY: University of Rochester Press, 2016.

Stride pianists
Swing pianists
African-American pianists
American jazz pianists
American male pianists
Deaths from cholera
People from Pocahontas, Virginia
People from Bluefield, West Virginia
1903 births
1945 deaths
Infectious disease deaths in India
20th-century American pianists
Jazz musicians from Virginia
20th-century American male musicians
American male jazz musicians
20th-century African-American musicians